New Jalpaiguri–Amritsar Clone Superfast Express is a Express train of the Indian Railways connecting the cities of Amritsar in Punjab and Siliguri in West Bengal. It is currently being operated with 04653/04654 train numbers on a weekly basis.

Coach composition
New Jalpaiguri–Amritsar Clone Superfast Express consists of Nine Third AC (3AC) coaches, One AC Three Tier Economy (ME1) Coach, six Sleeper (SL) coaches, One Engine cum Generator Coach and One Second Sitting(2S) Coach.

Timings

Route
New Jalpaiguri (Siliguri) (Starts)

 (Ends)

Traction

See also
Dibrugarh–Amritsar Express

References

Transport in Siliguri
Transport in Amritsar
Named passenger trains of India
Rail transport in West Bengal
Rail transport in Bihar
Rail transport in Uttar Pradesh
Rail transport in Haryana
Rail transport in Punjab, India